Dyshod Carter  (born June 18, 1978) is a former American football cornerback who played for the New England Patriots in 2003 before being allocated to the Scottish Claymores of the NFL Europe League. Carter also played for the Cleveland Browns and the Arizona Cardinals of the NFL. He signed as a free agent with the Toronto Argonauts of the Canadian Football League on April 1, 2008, but was released over a month later on May 12, which was also a few days after his arrest in Colorado (see below).
2003 Scottish Claymores Roster

College career
Carter attended Kansas State University.

Arrest
In May 2008, the Arizona Republic newspaper reported that Carter was arrested in Glendale, Colorado  on cocaine-related charges.

References

1978 births
American football cornerbacks
Arizona Cardinals players
Cleveland Browns players
Kansas State Wildcats football players
Living people
Players of American football from Denver